Blackman–Bosworth Store, also known as Bosworth Store Building, S.N. Bosworth's Cheap Cash Store, David Blackman's Store, and Randolph County Museum, is a historic general store located at Beverly, Randolph County, West Virginia, United States.  It consists of the original section, built about 1828, with an addition built in 1894.  The original section is a two-story brick building on a cut-stone foundation.  In addition to being operated as a general store into the 1920s, the building had short-term use as county courthouse, post office and semi-official meeting place. In 1973, the Randolph County Historical Society purchased the property, and it now serves as the Randolph County Museum and as a meeting place.

It was listed on the National Register of Historic Places in 1975.

References

External links
Historic Beverly: Randolph County Museum

History museums in West Virginia
Commercial buildings on the National Register of Historic Places in West Virginia
Commercial buildings completed in 1828
Buildings and structures in Randolph County, West Virginia
Museums in Randolph County, West Virginia
National Register of Historic Places in Randolph County, West Virginia
Former courthouses in West Virginia
U.S. Route 50
1828 establishments in Virginia